The Raytheon MGM-157 EFOGM (Enhanced Fiber Optic Guided Missile) was a long-range enhanced fiber optic guided missile developed for the U.S. Army during the 1980s and 1990s to test the use of fiber optics in missiles. The missile was launched vertically and manually controlled by an operator on the ground by use of a television camera mounted on the nose. The signals from the camera were carried via a thin wire that unspooled the further up the missile reached. The weapon was primarily designed for anti-tank use, or against low flying helicopters.

See also
ALAS
CM-501G
FOG-MPM
XM501 Non-Line-of-Sight Launch System
Polyphem, a similar European project
Type 96 Multi-Purpose Missile System

References

Anti-tank guided missiles of the United States
Surface-to-air missiles of the United States